Amy Lynn Loudenbeck (born September 29, 1969) is an American politician and legislator.

Originally from the Detroit and Chicago area, Loudenbeck graduated from the University of Wisconsin–Madison in 1991. She was elected to the Wisconsin State Assembly in 2010 as a Republican from the 45th district. (Democratic incumbent Chuck Benedict did not seek re-election.)

She was a candidate in the 2022 Wisconsin Secretary of State Election., calling for the Wisconsin Elections Commission to be dismantled and power over elections returned to the Secretary of State. She lost by a margin of 7,600 votes to incumbent Doug La Follette.

Notes

1969 births
21st-century American politicians
21st-century American women politicians
Living people
Republican Party members of the Wisconsin State Assembly
People from Clinton, Rock County, Wisconsin
Politicians from Chicago
Politicians from Detroit
University of Wisconsin–Madison alumni
Women state legislators in Wisconsin